Bernard Cassen (born 2 November 1937 in Paris) is a French journalist.

Career
He is a founder of ATTAC, and a member of its Scientific Advisory Board.

He was general director of the Le Monde diplomatique newspaper from 1973 to January 2008.

References

External links
 
 

1937 births
Living people
Journalists from Paris
French activists
French male non-fiction writers